Redwater or red water may refer to:

Geographical locations
Redwater, Mississippi
Redwater, Texas
Redwater River, a stream in Montana
Athabasca-Redwater provincial electoral district in Alberta, Canada
Redwater, Alberta, a town in Alberta, Canada
Redwater, Ontario, an unincorporated place and railway point in Ontario, Canada
Redwater River (Alberta) a river in Alberta, Canada

Other
 Red Water, 2003 television film
 Kat and Alfie: Redwater, 2017 BBC series
 Blood
 Red water, a waste product in TNT manufacture; see pink water
 Red water, a fictional liquid in the Fullmetal Alchemist series—see Alchemy in art and entertainment
 "Red Water", a song by Type O Negative from the album October Rust
"Red Water", a song by Earl Sweatshirt from the album Some Rap Songs
 Red water disease, an English appellation for babesiosis, a tick-borne disease of animals